Antoine Mason (born May 24, 1992) is an American basketball player for Al Wehdat of the Jordanian Premier Basketball League. He spent his first three years of college eligibility at Niagara University. He then transferred to Auburn University. Mason went undrafted in the 2015 NBA draft and subsequently signed with Apollon Limassol in Cyprus.

Early life
Mason was born in Queens, New York, in 1992. He is the son of late former NBA player Anthony Mason and Latifa Whitlock Mason. He has one brother, Anthony Jr.

Mason attended New Rochelle High School and was named the school's athlete of the year as a senior.

College career
Mason joined Niagara as a freshman in 2010–11. He played in three games before suffering a foot injury that ended his season. The following year, he started every game and was named to the MAAC All-Rookie team.

In 2012–13, Mason scored 18.7 points per game to rank second in the MAAC. He was named to the All-MAAC first team and the MAAC All-Tournament team. As of March 8, 2014, he was averaging 25.6 points per game to rank second in NCAA Division I.

On May 21, 2014, and upon the conclusion of his redshirt junior season, he announced that he would be transferring for the 2014–15 season. The NCAA did not make him wait a season for transferring since he had already earned his undergraduate degree.

On December 23, 2014 Mason scored his 2,000th career point in a 61–60 win over Texas Southern.

Professional career
After going undrafted in the 2015 NBA draft, Mason signed with Apollon Limassol of the Cypriot League.

On October 31, 2016, Mason signed with the Rio Grande Valley Vipers of the NBA Development League, but was waived on November 10 before playing a game for the team. In the 2017-18 season, he played with the Halifax Hurricanes of  NBL Canada and averaged 20.3 points, 4.6 rebounds and 2.5 assists per game. Mason was named to the Second Team All-NBLC.

On June 3, 2018, Mason signed with the Fujian Lightning in China. He rejoined Halifax in December 2019. Mason averaged 25.7 points, 5.6 rebounds, and 2.5 assists per game, earning First Team All-NBL Canada honors. On July 22, 2020, he signed with CB Ciudad de Valladolid of the LEB Oro. Mason averaged 11.9 points, 2.6 rebounds, and 1.4 assists per game. On November 22, 2021, he signed with Al Wehdat of the Jordanian Premier Basketball League.

The Basketball Tournament
In 2017, Mason played for The Washington Generals of The Basketball Tournament. Mason's team lost in the round of 64.

Career Statistics

Professional

|-
| align="left" |  2017–18
| align="left" | Halifax Hurricanes
| NBL Canada
| 51 || 35.4 || .431 || .308 || .740 || 4.7 || 2.6 || 1.1 || .1 || 20.2
|-
| align="left" |  2018
| align="left" | Fujian Lightning
| NBL China
| 25 || 38.8 || .483 || .263 || .683 || 6.5 || 2.8 || 1.6 || .0 || 33.3
|-
| align="left" |  2020–21
| align="left" | CB Ciudad de Valladolid
| LEB Oro
| 25 || 25.3 || .424 || .185 || .642 || 2.6 || 1.4 || .7 || .0 || 11.9
|-
|-class=sortbottom
| align="center" colspan=2 | Career
| All Leagues
| 101 || 33.8 || .449 || .278 || .703 || 4.6 || 2.3 || 1.1 || .1 || 21.4

References

1992 births
Living people
American expatriate basketball people in Canada
American expatriate basketball people in Cyprus
American expatriate basketball people in Spain
American men's basketball players
Apollon Limassol BC players
Auburn Tigers men's basketball players
Basketball players from New York City
Guards (basketball)
Halifax Hurricanes players
Niagara Purple Eagles men's basketball players
Sportspeople from New Rochelle, New York
Sportspeople from Queens, New York